Mikael Boström (born 3 October 1970 in Siuntio) is a Finnish orienteering competitor, and winner of the first Junior World Orienteering Championships in 1990, both individual and relay.

Senior career
He received a silver medal in the relay at the World Orienteering Championships in Grimstad in 1997 (with Timo Karppinen, Juha Peltola and Janne Salmi), and again a silver medal in Inverness in 1999 (with Jani Lakanen, Juha Peltola and Janne Salmi).

See also
 Finnish orienteers
 List of orienteers
 List of orienteering events

References

External links
 
 

1970 births
Living people
People from Siuntio
Finnish orienteers
Male orienteers
Foot orienteers
World Orienteering Championships medalists
Junior World Orienteering Championships medalists
Competitors at the 2001 World Games
Swedish-speaking Finns
Sportspeople from Uusimaa